The Women's time trial H3 road cycling event at the 2012 Summer Paralympics took place on September 5 at Brands Hatch. Eight riders from eight nations competed. The race distance was 16 km.

Results

References

Women's road time trial H3
2012 in women's road cycling